The Kampala–Gulu Highway, also Kampala–Gulu Road, is a road connecting the capital city of Kampala, in the Central Region, with the city of Gulu, the largest urban centre in the Northern Region of Uganda.

Location

The road passes through the districts of  Kampala, Wakiso,  Luweero, Nakasongola, Kiryandongo, Oyam, Omoro and Gulu. The coordinates of the road near the town of Karuma are 02°14'04.0"N, 32°14'46.0"E
(Latitude:2.234444; Longitude:32.246111).

Overview
The road from Kampala to Gulu is old (first constructed in the 1940s), and narrow. Instead of the regulatory  of roadway, with shoulders and drainage channels, this road is only  in some sections, leaving little room for vehicles to overtake one another. The Kampala–Gulu Road, is one of the most accident-prone in the country, along with Kampala–Jinja Road, Kampala–Masaka Road and the Kampala Northern Bypass Highway.

In 2016, the Uganda National Roads Authority (UNRA), committed to widen the narrow sections of this road.

Intersections
Along its journey, the Kampala–Gulu Highway intersects with several major roadways, including the following: (a) at Bwaise, it cuts across the Kampala Northern Bypass Highway. (b) the  Matugga–Kapeeka Road peels off the highway at Matugga. (c) in Wobulenzi, the Ziroobwe–Wobulenzi Road connects with this highway (d) the Luweero–Butalangu Road intersects with the Gulu highway in Luweero.

(f) At Rwekunye, the Rwekunye–Apac–Aduku–Lira–Kitgum–Musingo Road meets the Kampala–Gulu Highway. (g) The  Masindi–Kigumba Road meets with the Gulu Highway. (h) in Karuma, north of the Karuma Bridge, the Karuma–Olwiyo–Pakwach–Nebbi–Arua Road makes a sharp left turn, off the Kampala-Gulu Highway. (i) Approximately  further north, at Kamdini, the Kamdini–Lira Road, makes a sharp right turn to continue on to Lira,  to the east.

In Gulu, this road interacts with the Gulu–Nimule Road and with the Gulu-Kitgum Road.

Other considerations
When the Kampala–Bombo Expressway is built, as expected, it will constitute the first  of the Kampala–Gulu Highway. From Kamdini, the Kampala–Gulu Highway continues north, for another , as the Kamdini–Gulu Road.

See also
 Transport in Uganda
 List of roads in Uganda
 List of cities and towns in Uganda

References

External links
 Western region takes lion's share of roads money
 Uganda National Road Authority Homepage
 Oil Sparks Roads Upgrade

Roads in Uganda
Western Region, Uganda
Northern Region, Uganda
Kampala District
Wakiso District
Luweero District
Nakasongola District
Kiryandongo District
Oyam District
Omoro District
Gulu District